The St. Felix's flood (in Dutch Sint-Felixvloed) happened on Saturday, 5 November 1530, the name day of St. Felix. This day was later known as Evil Saturday (kwade zaterdag). Large parts of Flanders and Zeeland were washed away, including the Verdronken Land van Reimerswaal.  According to Audrey M. Lambert, "all the Oost Wetering of Zuid-Beveland was lost, save only the town of Reimerswaal."

Reportedly, more than 100,000 were killed in the Netherlands by the St. Felix's flood.

See also
Floods in the Netherlands

References

External links
 deltawerken.com

Floods in the Netherlands
1530 in the Holy Roman Empire
1530 in the Habsburg Netherlands
16th-century floods
1530s in the Habsburg Netherlands
European windstorms
History of Zeeland